Caenorhabditis latens is a species of nematodes. Prior to 2014, it was referred to as Caenorhabditis sp. 23. The reference strain VX88 was isolated from soil near a lotus pond and strain VX85 was isolated from soil under rotten grass in Juifeng Village, Wuhan City, Hubei Province, China.

This species groups with C. remanei in the 'Elegans' supergroup in phylogenetic studies

References

External links 
 Strain VX85 at Caenorhabditis Genetics Center, University of Minnesota
 Strain VX88 at Caenorhabditis Genetics Center, University of Minnesota
 RhabditinaDB at Department of Biology, New York University

latens
Nematodes described in 2014
Fauna of China